Francis Cornan (5 May 1880 – 31 May 1971) was an English professional footballer born in Sunderland, who played as an inside left or left half. He made 165 appearances in the Football League playing for Barnsley (in three separate spells), Birmingham and Aston Villa. He died in Halifax, West Yorkshire, aged 91.

References
 
 

1880 births
1971 deaths
Footballers from Sunderland
English footballers
Association football inside forwards
Association football wing halves
Barnsley F.C. players
Birmingham City F.C. players
Aston Villa F.C. players
Spennymoor United F.C. players
Nelson F.C. players
Exeter City F.C. players
English Football League players